The Hulman family is a family of Indiana businesspeople and philanthropists best known as the former owners of the Indianapolis Motor Speedway, the Indy Racing League and Hulman & Co., which produces Clabber Girl Baking Powder.

Notable members include:

 Anton "Tony" Hulman and Mary Fendrich Hulman
 Their daughter Mari Hulman George (born Mary Antonia Hulman)
 Mari's son Tony George (born Anton Hulman George)
 His step-son Ed Carpenter (racing driver)
 Mari's grandson Kyle Krisiloff

People from Indianapolis
Families from Indiana